Rabani Ghulam (born 8 October 1951) is a former Afghanistan boxer, who competed at the 1980 Summer Olympic Games in the lightweight event. He lost his first round fight to Jong Jo-Ung of North Korea.

1980 Olympic results
Below is the record of Rabani Ghulam, an Afghani lightweight boxer who competed at the 1980 Moscow Olympics:
 
 Round of 32: lost to Jong Jo-Ung (North Korea) referee stopped contest

References

Boxers at the 1980 Summer Olympics
Olympic boxers of Afghanistan
1951 births
Living people
Place of birth missing (living people)
Afghan male boxers
Lightweight boxers